This is a list of diseases starting with the letter "E".

Eb
 Ebola virus disease

Ec

Ech
 Echovirus infection

Ect

Ecto

Ectod

Ectode
 Ectodermal dysplasia absent dermatoglyphics
 Ectodermal dysplasia adrenal cyst
 Ectodermal dysplasia alopecia preaxial polydactyly
 Ectodermal dysplasia anhidrotic
 Ectodermal dysplasia arthrogryposis diabetes mellitus
 Ectodermal dysplasia Bartalos type
 Ectodermal dysplasia Berlin type
 Ectodermal dysplasia blindness
 Ectodermal dysplasia ectrodactyly macular dystrophy
 Ectodermal dysplasia hypohidrotic autosomal dominant
 Ectodermal dysplasia hypohidrotic hypothyroidism ciliary dyskinesia
 Ectodermal dysplasia Margarita type
 Ectodermal dysplasia mental retardation CNS malformation
 Ectodermal dysplasia mental retardation syndactyly
 Ectodermal dysplasia neurosensory deafness
 Ectodermal dysplasia osteosclerosis
 Ectodermal dysplasia tricho odonto onychial type
 Ectodermal dysplasia, hydrotic
 Ectodermal dysplasia, hypohidrotic, autosomal recessive
 Ectodermal dysplasia
 Ectodermic dysplasia anhidrotic cleft lip

Ectop
 Ectopia cordis
 Ectopia lentis
 Ectopia pupillae
 Ectopic coarctation
 Ectopic ossification familial type
 Ectopic pregnancy

Ectr
 Ectrodactyly cardiopathy dysmorphism
 Ectrodactyly cleft palate syndrome
 Ectrodactyly diaphragmatic hernia corpus callosum
 Ectrodactyly dominant form
 Ectrodactyly ectrodermal dysplasia
 Ectrodactyly polydactyly
 Ectrodactyly recessive form
 Ectrodactyly
 Ectrodactyly–ectodermal dysplasia–cleft syndrome
 Ectropion inferior cleft lip and or palate

Ecz
 Eczema

Ed–Eg
 Edinburgh malformation syndrome
 Edwards–Patton–Dilly syndrome
 Edwards syndrome
 Eec syndrome without cleft lip palate
 Eec syndrome
 Eem syndrome
 Egg hypersensitivity
 Egg shaped pupils

Eh–Ek
 Ehlers–Danlos syndrome
 Ehrlichiosis
 Eijkman's syndrome
 Eiken syndrome
 Eisenmenger syndrome
 Ekbom syndrome

El–Em
 Elattoproteus in context of NF
 Elective mutism
 Ectrodactyly–ectodermal dysplasia–cleft syndrome
 Electron transfer flavoprotein, deficiency of
 Elejalde syndrome
 Elephant man in context of NF
 Elephantiasis
 Elliott–Ludman–Teebi syndrome
 Ellis–Yale–Winter syndrome
 Ellis–van Creveld syndrome
 Emerinopathy
 Emery–Nelson syndrome
 Emery–Dreifuss muscular dystrophy, dominant type
 Emery–Dreifuss muscular dystrophy, X-linked
 Emery–Dreifuss muscular dystrophy
 Emetophobia
 Emphysema, congenital lobar
 Emphysema
 Emphysema-penoscrotal web-deafness-mental retardation
 Empty sella syndrome

En

Ena–Enc
 Enamel hypoplasia cataract hydrocephaly
 Encephalitis
 Encephalitis lethargica
 Encephalo cranio cutaneous lipomatosis
 Encephalocele anencephaly
 Encephalocele anterior
 Encephalocele frontal
 Encephalocele
 Encephalomyelitis, myalgic
 Encephalomyelitis
 Encephalopathy
 Encephalopathy, chronic traumatic
 Encephalopathy, epileptic
 Encephalopathy, Fetal Alcohol
 Encephalopathy, Gluten
 Encephalopathy, Glycine
 Encephalopathy, Hashimoto's
 Encephalopathy, Hepatic
 Encephalopathy, HIV associated
 Encephalopathy, Hypertensive
 Encephalopathy, Hypoxic ischemic
 Encephalopathy, Lyme
 Encephalopathy, Mitochondrial
 Encephalopathy, Neonatal
 Encephalopathy, Static
 Encephalopathy, Toxic
 Encephalopathy, transmissible spongiform
 Encephalopathy, Uremic
 Encephalopathy, Wernicke's
 Encephalopathy intracerebral calcification retinal
 Encephalopathy progressive optic atrophy
 Encephalopathy subacute spongiform, Gerstmann-Stra
 Encephalopathy-basal ganglia-calcification
 Encephalopathy recurrent of childhood
 Encephalotrigeminal angiomatosis
 Enchondromatosis (benign)
 Enchondromatosis dwarfism deafness
 Enchondromatosis dwarfism calfness
 Encopresis

End–Ent
 Endocardial fibroelastosis
 Endocarditis, infective
 Endocarditis
 Endocrinopathy
 Endometrial stromal sarcoma
 Endometriosis
 Endomyocardial fibroelastosis
 Endomyocardial fibrosis
 Enetophobia
 Eng–Strom syndrome
 Engelhard–Yatziv syndrome
 Englemann disease
 Enolase deficiency type 1
 Enolase deficiency type 2
 Enolase deficiency type 3
 Enolase deficiency type 4
 Enolase deficiency
 Enterobiasis
 Enteropathica
 Enterovirus antenatal infection
 Entomophthoramycosis

Enu–Env
 Enuresis
 Envenomization by bothrops lanceolatus
 Envenomization by the Martinique lancehead viper
 Environment associated hypertension

Eo
 Eosinophilia
 Eosinophilia–myalgia syndrome
 Eosinophilic cryptitis
 Eosinophilic cystitis
 Eosinophilic fasciitis
 Eosinophilic gastroenteritis
 Eosinophilic granuloma
 Eosinophilic lymphogranuloma
 Eosinophilic pustular folliculitis
 Eosinophilic myocarditis
 Eosinophilic synovitis
 Eosophobia

Ep

Epe
 Ependymoblastoma
 Ependymoma

Epi
 Epicondylitis

Epid

Epide

Epidem
 Epidemic encephalitis
 Epidemic encephalomyelitis

Epider
Epiderma
 Epidermal nevus vitamin D resistant rickets
Epidermo
Epidermod–Epidermoi
 Epidermodysplasia verruciformis
 Epidermoid carcinoma
Epidermol
 Epidermolysa bullosa simplex and limb girdle muscular dystrophy
 Epidermolysis bullosa acquisita
 Epidermolysis bullosa dystrophica, Bart type
 Epidermolysis bullosa dystrophica, dominant type
 Epidermolysis bullosa herpetiformis, Dowling–Meara
 Epidermolysis bullosa intraepidermic
 Epidermolysis bullosa inversa dystrophica
 Epidermolysis bullosa simplex with anodontia, hair
 Epidermolysis bullosa simplex, Cockayne–Touraine type
 Epidermolysis bullosa simplex, Koebner type
 Epidermolysis bullosa simplex, Ogna type
 Epidermolysis bullosa, dermolytic
 Epidermolysis bullosa, generalized atrophic benign
 Epidermolysis bullosa, junctional, Herlitz–Pearson
 Epidermolysis bullosa, junctional, with pyloric atrophy
 Epidermolysis bullosa, junctional
 Epidermolysis bullosa, pretibial
 Epidermolysis bullosa
 Epidermolytic hyperkeratosis
 Epidermolytic palmoplantar keratoderma Vorner type

Epidi
 Epididymitis

Epil–Epis
 Epilepsia partialis continua
 Epilepsy
 Epilepsy benign neonatal familial
Epilepsy benign neonatal familial 1
Epilepsy benign neonatal familial 2
Epilepsy benign neonatal familial 3
 Epilepsy juvenile absence
 Epilepsy mental deterioration Finnish type
 Epilepsy microcephaly skeletal dysplasia
 Epilepsy occipital calcifications
 Epilepsy progressive myoclonic
 Epilepsy telangiectasia
 Epilepsy with myoclono-astatic crisis
 Epilepsy, benign occipital
 Epilepsy, myoclonic progressive familial
 Epilepsy, nocturnal, frontal lobe type
 Epilepsy, partial, familial
 Epimerase deficiency
 Epimetaphyseal dysplasia cataract
 Epimetaphyseal skeletal dysplasia
 Epiphyseal dysplasia dysmorphism camptodactyly
 Epiphyseal dysplasia hearing loss dysmorphism
 Epiphyseal dysplasia multiple
 Epiphyseal stippling syndrome osteoclastic hyperplasia
 Epiphysealis hemimelica dysplasia

Epit
 Epithelial-myoepithelial carcinoma
 Epitheliopathy (APMPPE)
 Epitheliopathy, acute posterior multifocal placoid

Epp–Eps
 EPP (erythropoietic protoporphyria)
 Epstein barr virus mononucleosis
 Epstein syndrome

Eq
 Equinophobia

Er
 Erb–Duchenne palsy
 Erdheim disease
 Erdheim–Chester disease
 Ergophobia
 Eronen–Somer–Gustafsson syndrome
 Erosive pustular dermatosis of the scalp
 Erysipelas
 Erythema multiforme
 Erythema nodosum
 Erythermalgia
 Erythroblastopenia
 Erythroderma desquamativa of Leiner
 Erythroderma lethal congenital
 Erythrokeratodermia ataxia
 Erythrokeratodermia progressive symmetrica ichthyosis
 Erythrokeratodermia symmetrica progressiva
 Erythrokeratodermia variabilis ichthyosis
 Erythrokeratodermia variabilis, Mendes da Costa type
 Erythrokeratodermia with ataxia
 Erythrokeratolysis hiemalis ichthyosis
 Erythromelalgia
 Erythroplakia
 Erythroplasia of Queyrat
 Erythropoietic protoporphyria

Es–Et
 Escher–Hirt syndrome
 Escherichia coli infection
 Esophageal atresia associated anomalies
 Esophageal atresia coloboma talipes
 Esophageal atresia
 Esophageal disorder
 Esophageal duodenal atresia abnormalities of hands
 Esophageal neoplasm
 Esophageal varices
 Esophoria
 Esotropia
 Essential fatty acid deficiency
 Essential hypertension
 Essential iris atrophy
 Essential mixed cryoglobulinemia
 Essential thrombocytopenia
 Essential thrombocythemia - synonym of Essential thrombocytosis
 Essential thrombocytosis
 Esthesioneuroblastoma
 Ethylmalonic aciduria
 Ethylmalonic adipic aciduria

Eu–Ew
 Euhidrotic ectodermal dysplasia
 Eumycetoma
 Eunuchoidism familial
 Evan's syndrome
 Ewing's sarcoma

Ex–Ey
 Exencephaly
 Exercise induced anaphylaxis
 Exfoliative dermatitis
 Exner syndrome
 Exogenous lipoid pneumonia
 Exomphalos-macroglossia-gigantism syndrome
 Exophoria
 Exophthalmos
 Exostoses anetodermia brachydactyly type E
 Exostoses, multiple
 Exostoses, multiple, type 1
 Exostoses, multiple, type 2
 Exostoses, multiple, type 3
 Exostoses
 Exotropia
 Experimental allergic encephalomyelitis
 Exploding head syndrome
 Exstrophy of the bladder
 Exstrophy of the bladder-epispadias
 Exudative retinopathy familial, autosomal dominant
 Exudative retinopathy familial, autosomal recessive
 Exudative retinopathy familial, X linked, recessive
 Exudative retinopathy, familial
 Extrapyramidal disorder
 Extrasystoles short stature hyperpigmentation microcephaly
 Eye defects arachnodactyly cardiopathy
 Eyebrows duplication syndactyly

E